The Royal National Children's Foundation (RNCF) is a British charity which helps children facing abuse, neglect or trauma at home by providing them with the opportunity to move into a supported education environment. The RNCF currently enables nearly 400 vulnerable and disadvantaged children to attend state and independent boarding schools and day schools. As well as paying school fees, the RNCF also funds counselling, educational school trips and holidays for vulnerable children, many of whom have never had a holiday.

History 
The RNCF is the successor charity to an organisation founded as an orphanage by Dr Andrew Reed in 1827. From 1842 (when Queen Victoria became the first Patron), it was successively known as the Infant Orphan Asylum, the Royal Infant Orphanage, the Royal Wanstead School, and the Royal Wanstead Children's Foundation. The school was based at Wanstead on the edge of Epping Forest in grand buildings that today house the Snaresbrook Crown Court. The charity was merged in December 2010 with the Joint Educational Trust (JET), with which it has been closely collaborating for some 25 years. JET was founded in the 1970s by a group of prep school head teachers. The first JET chairman was wartime hero Group Captain Douglas Bader.

The Royal National Children's Foundation no longer operates its own boarding schools but helps to support vulnerable children at a range of boarding schools throughout the United Kingdom. These young people have one or no active parents and have suffered some degree of abuse, neglect, fear and disruption in their home, family or school environment such as to be seriously prejudicial to their normal development.

RNCF has supported 3,000 vulnerable, disadvantaged children at some 150 different boarding schools since the closure of its own schools in 1971. It describes this work as Assisted Boarding but it also supports some vulnerable children (up to the age of 13) at independent day schools.

Today 
It funds the schooling of these beneficiaries by putting together packages with the support of other charities and the schools themselves. In this way, RNCF leverages its own funds some seven times (x 7) so that a RNCF grant of c£4,000 can effectively secure the fees for a vulnerable young person at an independent boarding school for a whole year. Coupled with the charity's low administrative costs, this helps ensure that a very large proportion of all donations and legacies go direct to paying fees for these disadvantaged young people.

The Royal National Children's Foundation helps to support some 400 children at more than 100 state and independent boarding and prep day schools. These children benefit from the high levels of pastoral care and individual attention available especially at many boarding schools. Royal National supports its beneficiaries for either the duration of their secondary schooling or until they no longer need the charity's support. In many cases, therefore, the charity is supporting these vulnerable young people for 7–8 years. The charity's invested endowment helps underwrite its commitment and ensures the continuity of schooling and care for young people who have already  suffered so much disruption in their short lives.

Between 2001 and July 2016, the RNCF's Chairman was Colin Morrison, a publisher who was formerly a beneficiary of the charity. Morrison was succeeded by Kevin Parry.

The RNCF's Patron is the Princess Royal. During a speech at the charity's annual conference in 2010, The Princess Royal said: "Boarding school will , by no means, suit every child vulnerable or not. But our case studies show that, for the right child in the right school at the right time, Assisted Boarding really can help transform a young person's life and prospects. I commend the Royal National Children's Foundation as a highly-effective charity deserving of support."

RNCF has been active in campaigning for the Government to recognise and incentivise the 'vital welfare role' of boarding schools at a time when (he says) the number of boarding places has declined by up to 40% in less than 25 years. It has also called for local authorities to use 'foster boarding' to help solve the acute shortage of carers. He has advocated that local authorities could more readily recruit as foster parents some working couples where the children were in boarding schools. RNCF has said: "It's not for all children, and not for all foster carers, but it's an idea to consider when local authorities are trying to secure the future of a child in care. Boarding schools can and should be part of the solution for many more vulnerable children than they are currently. Modern boarding schools have so much to offer vulnerable children."

The charity's "Breaking Through" research for the charity shows how - over the long term - these Assisted Boarders tend to be among their schools' star performers across a range of social, emotional and academic criteria. He ascribes at least some of this success to the way in which these young people grasp their "golden opportunity" with both hands: they appreciate their good fortune in being able to develop a promising new life after a particularly troubled start.

In 2011, Colin Morrison launched the Assisted Boarding Network to promote the effectiveness of Assisted Boarding for vulnerable young people in the care of local authorities. The Network, which is now being jointly promoted both by the RNCF and Buttle UK, was launched at a Westminster conference in June 2012, addressed by Tim Loughton, the Under Secretary of State for Children & Families and by Lord (Andrew) Adonis his predecessor in the former Labour government. The conference was attended by representatives from more than 60 local authorities throughout England and Wales.

The Foundation is now seeking increases in donations, legacies and subscriptions to help it expand Assisted Boarding. It is also seeking to persuade more grant-making charities and other organisations to help provide long-term support for these vulnerable children.

With the merger of Royal Wanstead Children's Foundation and the Joint Educational Trust (JET) — to form the Royal National Children's Foundation — the charity declared its aim to increase to 500 the number of vulnerable young people supported within five years. The appeal was launched with a dinner in February 2011 hosted by The Princess Royal at Buckingham Palace.

The RNCF has offices at King Edward's School, Witley and the Cobham, Surrey campus at Reed's School, another charitable institution founded in the early 19th century by Dr Andrew Reed. The Directors of the charity are Mrs Christine Hughes (Director of Operations) and David Bassom (Director of Marketing and Fundraising). Kevin Parry is the Chairman of the RNCF. Presidents of the charity include: the Archbishops of Canterbury, York and Westminster, Lord Adonis, and the Bishop of London.

References

External links
 RNCF website
 Friends of Royal Wanstead School

Royal charities of the United Kingdom
Children's charities based in the United Kingdom
1827 establishments in the United Kingdom
Organizations established in 1827